Kop'ung County is a kun, or county, in Chagang province, North Korea.  Prior to the division of Korea, it was part of Chosan county.

Geography
Most of Kop'ung is mountainous, but lower in the west. The Kangnam and Chogyuryong (적유령산맥) ranges pass through the county. The chief streams are the Chungman River and the Komyonchon, Wolmyongchon, and Pungmyonchon streams. The highest peak is Koamsan.  Some 89.4% of the county's area is forestland. There are karstic regions in the county. The Songwon Reservoir is located there.

Administrative divisions
Kop'ung County is divided into 1 ŭp (town) and 12 ri (villages):

Economy
The chief local industry is agriculture, centered on dry-field farming. Crops include maize, soybeans, wheat, barley, radishes, cabbage, gochu peppers, and cucumbers. Orcharding, sericulture, and livestock raising are also carried out. In addition, some rice is cultivated along the valleys of the Chungman and the other streams.

There are deposits of iron, gold, copper, lead, zinc, tungsten, graphite, coal, and limestone, among other minerals. There is relatively little manufacturing.

Kopung is served by roads. The Chungman River is used to ship raw lumber downstream.

See also
Geography of North Korea
Administrative divisions of North Korea
Chagang

References

External links

Counties of Chagang